Raja Sirimevan Wanasundera PC (11 February 1924 - 31 October 2012) was a Sri Lankan judge who served as a Puisne Justice of the Supreme Court and the 27th Solicitor General of Sri Lanka.

Early life, education and family
Raja Wanasundera was born in Ratnapura on 11 February 1924 to a Kandyan family. He is a descendant of Ehelepola Nilame. Wanasundera attended Royal College, Colombo. He obtained a Bachelor of Arts from the University College Colombo and pursued legal studies upon entering the Law College. He is also a graduate of the University of London and has completed postgraduate courses in International Law and Constitutional Law at Stanford University.

Former Supreme Court Justice S. R. Wijayatilake is Wanasundera's brother in law, and uncle to his son former Attorney General Yuwanjana Wijayatilake.

Raja Wanasundera died in the early hours of 31 October 2012.

Legal career
Wanasundera was called to the Bar on 27 April 1947. He served his apprenticeship in the chambers of N. E. Weerasooria, K.C. He served as an Acting Crown Counsel from January 1952 and was appointed Crown Counsel on 29 March 1954. He was promoted to Solicitor General, succeeding Hector Deheragoda, and held the office until 1974. He was succeeded by Shiva Pasupati. He also acted as Attorney General in 1973. On the 5 June 1975 he was appointed to the bench of the Supreme Court. As a Puisne Justice of the Supreme Court he has on several occasions acted as Acting Chief Justice.

With the stepping down of Chief Justice Suppiah Sharvananda, Wanasundera, the senior most judge on the bench, was passed over as his successor when President J. R. Jayewardene appointed Justice Parinda Ranasinghe as his replacement. Justice Wanasundera had previously given a dissenting judgment against the government. The Sri Lanka Bar Association deplored this appointment.

References

W
1924 births
2012 deaths